Dracula gigas is a species of orchid. It is sometimes called the monkey orchid because it resembles the face of a monkey. This common name is shared with Orchis simia

See also
 Monkey orchid (disambiguation)

References

gigas
Plants described in 1978